Krasiatychi, also spelled Krasyatychi, is an urban-type settlement in Vyshhorod Raion, Kyiv Oblast (province) of Ukraine. It hosts the administration of Poliske settlement hromada, one of the hromadas of Ukraine.

Until 18 July 2020, Krasiatychi served as an administrative center of Poliske Raion. The raion was abolished that day as part of the administrative reform of Ukraine, which reduced the number of raions of Kyiv Oblast to seven. The area of Poliske Raion was merged into Vyshhorod Raion.

On 25th of February 2022, Russia invaded the settlement as part of the 2022 invasion of Ukraine. On 1 April 2022, Ukrainian forces regained control of Krasiatychi.

See also
Poliske
Vilcha
Chernobyl disaster
Chernobyl Exclusion Zone

References

External links

Urban-type settlements in Vyshhorod Raion
Radomyslsky Uyezd